The Ngadda River is a seasonal river in Nigeria that flows into Lake Chad and the Chad Basin. The Alau Dam built on the river has interfered with fertile seasonal floodplains in the region of Maiduguri.

References

Rivers of Nigeria
Lake Chad